Francis Guy Percy Wyndham FRSL (2 July 1924 – 28 December 2017) was an English author, literary editor and journalist.

Life and work 
Francis Wyndham was born in London in 1924 to Violet Lutetia Leverson and Guy Percy Wyndham. His mother was the daughter and biographer of the writer Ada Leverson (a friend of Oscar Wilde, whom Wilde called "Sphynx"). His father was a retired soldier and diplomat, had been a member of "The Souls", and was significantly older than his mother ("more like a grandfather really"). Wyndham also had a brother and, from his father's earlier marriage, a half-brother and half-sister, the photographer Olivia Wyndham (another son from this earlier marriage had died in the First World War).

He graduated from Eton in 1940, spent a year at Oxford University and then was drafted into the army in 1942 until it was discovered he was suffering from TB. He was discharged and returned to London, where he began writing reviews for The Times Literary Supplement and short stories (collected in Out of the War).  From 1953 he worked in publishing, first for Derek Verschoyle and then for André Deutsch as a reader (where he became involved with the writing careers of, and friends with, Bruce Chatwin, V. S. Naipaul, Jean Rhys and Edward St Aubyn).  He left to become an editor at Queen magazine and in 1964 was hired by The Sunday Times (moving with his friend Mark Boxer), where he stayed until 1980. He became Jean Rhys' literary executor after her death in 1979.

Selected bibliography

Fiction 
 Out of the War (1974)
 Mrs Henderson and Other Stories (1985)
 The Other Garden (1987)

Essays and non-fiction 
 Co-author with David King of Trotsky: A Documentary (1972)
 The Theatre of Embarrassment (1991)

Editing 
 Co-editor with Diana Melly of Jean Rhys: Letters 1931-1966 (1984), the selected letters of Jean Rhys.

Awards 
 Whitbread First Novel Award (1987) for The Other Garden

References

External links 
 "It was a monologue, but it was a monologue that I wanted to hear", Observer interview with Rachel Cooke, 17 August 2008.
 "Francis Wyndham: Bruce, Jean, Vidia and me", Independent interview with Edward St Aubyn and Suzi Feay, 17 August 2008.
 "Francis Wyndham talks about himself to Alan Hollinghurst" London Review of Books interview with Alan Hollinghurst, 1988 [paywall].
 Francis King, "More nattering please" - review of The Other Garden and Collected Stories, The Spectator, 10 September 2008.
 Francis Wyndham, "Tempting Targets" - review of Mother's Milk by Edward St Aubyn, New York Review of Books, 6 November 2008.

1924 births
2017 deaths
English male journalists
English editors
21st-century English novelists
20th-century English novelists
English male novelists
Fellows of the Royal Society of Literature
Francis
20th-century English male writers
21st-century English male writers
Writers from London
British Army personnel of World War II